Michael Smith (born March 3, 1957) is an American jazz saxophonist who has released albums as leader on Delmark Records, and his own labels Fastrax and Underground Labs.

Smith graduated in 1980 from the University of North Texas and played in the famed One O'Clock Lab Band. He studied with notable saxophone professor Jim Riggs.

That same year, he moved to Chicago. He toured with the Maynard Ferguson and Buddy Rich bands in the early 80s.  While he was with Buddy Rich, he toured with Frank Sinatra. Since 1981, he has worked for both Frank Sinatra and Frank Sinatra Jr. as featured saxophonist and music contractor. In 1985, he won a National Endowment for the Arts award. In 1993, he won the Cannonball Adderley  Award for alto saxophone. He has recorded and performed with Tony Bennett, Harry Connick, Jr., Nancy Wilson, Art Farmer and Nat Adderley. Mike has had a weekly spot at Andy's Jazz Club in Chicago for over thirty years. Currently, he is professor of saxophone at Roosevelt University, Chicago College of Performing Arts. In addition, he is a clinician and performing artist for Silver Eagle Saxophones and Rico Reeds. Mike is currently on the design team for the Verne Q. Powell Group. Working with Chris French and John Weir they are building and producing an American made saxophone in Elkhart, Indiana. This high end professional instrument will be called "The Silver Eagle" by Verne Q,Powell

Discography

As leader
Unit 7 (Delmark Records, 1990)
On a Cool Night (Delmark Records, 1992)
The Traveller (Delmark Records, 1993)
Sinatra Songbook (Delmark Records, 1995)
Ballads (Fastrax, 1997)
Mike Smith Quintet (Fastrax, 2004)
Mike Smith Quartet (Fastrax, 2006)
Grand Central (Fastrax, 2008)
Live at Andy's (Fastrax, 2012)
Homecoming (Fastrax, 2012)
Live at Andy's, Mike Smith 30th Anniversary (Fastrax, 2012)

References

External links
Hardbop Homepage, 

American jazz saxophonists
American male saxophonists
1957 births
Living people
Delmark Records artists
University of North Texas College of Music alumni
Roosevelt University faculty
21st-century American saxophonists
21st-century American male musicians
American male jazz musicians